The QorIQ Data Path Acceleration Architecture or  QorIQ DPAA is a architecture which integrates aspects of packet processing in the SoC, thereby addressing issues and requirements resulting from the multicore nature of QorIQ SoCs. The DPAA includes Cores, Network and packet I/O as well as hardware offload accelerators. 

The DPAA can be used to address various performance related requirements, especially those created by the high speed network I/O found on multicore SoCs such as the P4080.

References

External links 
 http://freescalesemi.com.cn/cstory/ftf/2009/download/net_f0279.pdf
 http://www.electropages.com/2010/08/freescale-three-new-qoriq-processors-incorporate-data-path-acceleration/ 
 http://cache.freescale.com/files/soft_dev_tools/doc/app_note/AN4543.pdf
 http://cache.freescale.com/files/soft_dev_tools/doc/user_guide/QORIQCSDPAAUG.pdf
 http://www.freescale.com/files/32bit/doc/white_paper/QORIQDPAAWP.pdf

Packets (information technology)